Mar Ivanios College is an autonomous educational institution situated in Thiruvananthapuram, Kerala, India. The college was ranked as 29th best college in the country by Ministry of Education's National Institutional Ranking Framework in 2019, and 48th in 2020. In 2021, the college improved its ranking by 4 places and became the 44th best college in the country.

The institution is located on a scenic hilltop with a sprawling campus area of hundreds of acres in Bethany Hills, Nalanchira, Thiruvananthapuram. Mar Ivanios College was established in 1949 by Geevarghese Mar Ivanios, the first Archbishop of Trivandrum.

Rankings

The college is the first Institution in the University of Kerala to receive accreditation from the National Assessment and Accreditation Council (NAAC) in 1999. The college was also the first to be re-assessed and re-accredited with ‘A’ Grade by NAAC in 2004. In 2011 the college was re-assessed by the NAAC Peer team as part of the Third Cycle of re-accreditation process.

Mar Ivanios College became the first private college affiliated to the University of Kerala to receive the status of CPE from the UGC. Upon the recommendation of the University Grants Commission (UGC), the college has been conferred autonomy status by the University of Kerala with effect from 13 June 2014. The motto of the college is ‘Veritas Vos Liberabit’ which means ‘Truth shall Liberate You’.

History

The college was founded in 1949 as an affiliated college of the then University of Travancore, later on under the Kerala University. The college was the dream child of the Late Archbishop Geevarghese Ivanios  of the Syro-Malankara Catholic Church, after whom the college was named.

Courses
Mar Ivanios College offers 17 degree courses and 8 post-graduate courses.

Degree courses offered  are: 
Bachelor of Science in physics, chemistry, mathematics, computer science, botany & bio technology, zoology, botany and statistics
BA in economics, English, journalism and mass communication, English, communicative English, analytical economics
BCom and BCom accounts and audit.

Post-graduate courses offered are:
MSc in mathematics, physics, chemistry, zoology
MA in English Language and Literature, Malayalam and media studies
MCom and MTTM.

The Departments of Zoology, Chemistry, Physics, Mathematics, Malayalam, Commerce, Biotechnology, Journalism and English are recognized research centres. It also offers facilities for an Indira Gandhi National Open University (IGNOU) study centre and an International Development Enterprises (IDE) centre.

Notable alumni

References

External links

College website

Syro-Malankara Catholic Church
Catholic universities and colleges in India
Arts and Science colleges in Kerala
Colleges in Thiruvananthapuram
Colleges affiliated to the University of Kerala
Educational institutions established in 1949
1949 establishments in India